The 2nd Infantry Division (2de Infanterie Divisie) was an infantry division of the Belgian Army that existed during the Battle of Belgium during the Second World War.

History

World War I 

At the start of World War I, the 2nd Infantry Division was known as ‘2nd Division,’ since they were one of only Seven active divisions of the Belgian Army in 1914. Commanded by Lieutenant-General Émile Dossin, the 2nd Division had its headquarters in Antwerp, and were initially composed of the 5th, 6th, and 7th Mixed Brigades, all of which are formed from Regiments of-the-line. Cavalry support came from the 4th Chasseurs Regiment, and artillery from the 2nd Artillery Regiment.

World War II 
Source:

At the start of the war on May 10, 1940, the 2nd division was assigned the southernmost portion of the Fortified Position of Liège. Along with the 3rd and 7th divisions it occupied the linchpin of the Belgian 'covering position', whose aim was to hold the Albert Canal and Meuse lines giving the French and British armies time to deploy along the K-W Line. The 2nd took up well prepared positions between the modernised fortresses of Boncelles, Embourg and Chaudfontaine, disposing of several bunkers positioned in two lines. 

However, when war broke out it became soon clear that the 7th division to its far north suffered a major defeat and that the two divisions of the III corps were in imminent danger of encirclement. By the end of 10 May, its units were summoned to immediately withdraw to the K-W Line. During this manoeuvre, the trains that carried most heavy armament of the 2nd's infantry regiments were bombed by the Luftwaffe, causing large loss of life and material.

Still, the division arrived the 12th on May on time at its assigned position between Rijmenam and Haacht. First contact with the enemy was made on May 15 by the 6th regiment of the line. 

On May 16, the order came for a general retreat away from the main line of resistance, due to the German breakthrough near Sedan. For the Belgian army, a retreat was ordered towards the Ghent Bridgehead, which was the last prepared line of defence. In two nightly marches, the 2nd division reached its assigned area between Moorslede and Kwatrecht. During the retreat, the 5th regiment of the line fought an intense rearguard action at the Willebroek canal near Rumbeek. 

The section of the 2nd was to be the most exposed position of the Bridghead south of the Scheldt. Upon arriving, the troops discovered in many places the barbed wire obstacles were removed by farmers during the harvest. Also, the troops discovered many of the bunkers were either closed or not fitted with the reglementary AT or machine guns. This is testimony of how ill-prepared the allied command was for such a quick retreat from what it believed would be the main line of resistance.

By May 20, first contact was made with German units. An early German probe with armoured cars towards Ghent in the sector of the 5th regiment of the line was repulsed using T-13 tank destroyers and effective artillery fire, destroying multiple German armour. A German attack on the 6th of the line succeeded in capturing some of the forward bunkers using flamethrowers, but was checked when Belgian artillery fire neutralized their supporting guns.

Early May 21, the 6th of the line performed a successful counterattack re-capturing some of the lost bunkers. German attacks in the afternoon, supported by heavy guns and the Luftwaffe were repulsed due to effective co-ordination with the 4th artillery regiment and reinforcements from the 28th line regiment and divisional reserves.

Despite an earlier counterattack by reinforcements from the 4th division and a few tanks, the Germans had more success on the lines of the 5th regiment. Both its 1st and 3rd battalion were pushed back to their second lines, some companies only narrowly escaping encirclement.

By 22 May, the Germans reached the English Channel, cutting the British, Belgian and remaining French armies off. The Belgians were ordered to retreat a third time. The 2nd Division was sent to a sector at the Lys-Bruges canal, near Hansbeke. This time, the 28th of the Line took up the primary position to give the 5th and 6th some time to recuperate. As the Belgians dug in, some counterattacks and artillery duels were fought to keep the approaching Germans from organising an early attack.

As the Lys battle unfolded, the 2nd Division was spared the worst as the main German breakthrough took place to its south. By the end of 26 May the Belgian front along the Lys was crumbling, and the 2nd was ordered to retreat yet again towards an improvised defensive line covering Bruges. Except for some strafing by the Luftwaffe, its regiments did not see action due to the Belgian capitulation on the 28th.

At least 242 officers, NCO and enlisted were killed in action.

Organization

1940 
Structure of the division at the eve of the Battle of Belgium:

 Headquarters, at Liège
 Commanding Officer, 2nd Division - Lieutenant-General Auguste Colpin
5th Line Regiment
6th Line Regiment
28th Line Regiment
2nd Artillery Regiment (Belgium)
 2nd Bicycle Squadron (to the 1st lancers regiment)
 12th Engineer Battalion (to the 6th army corps)
 2nd Signal Battalion
 1st Divisional Anti-Tank Gun Company (lorried)
 2nd Divisional Anti-Tank Gun Company (T-13) (to the 18th Division)
 2nd Divisional Supply Battalion
 2nd Divisional Field Hospital Battalion
 2nd Divisional Quartermaster Company
 2nd Divisional Anti Aircraft Company
 2nd Divisional Military Police Unit

See also 
 Belgian Army order of battle (1940)

References 

Infantry divisions of Belgium
Infantry divisions of Belgium in World War II
Battle of Belgium